Paseo Nuevo is an  open-air shopping center in downtown Santa Barbara, California. It is integrated into the street grid on and around lower State Street, both in terms of its Spanish Colonial Revival architecture, but also in that its pedestrian promenades, are similarly  positioned mid-block at right angles to the surrounding streets, as are the traditional alleyways of the city's downtown.

The center opened in 1990, was anchored by Nordstrom and a  Broadway department store. The mall was built by the Santa Barbara City Redevelopment Agency, and John Field was the architect.

The Broadway was converted to Macy's, which closed in 2017. That building is, as of mid-2020, still empty, and is now referred to as the Ortega Building. The Nordstrom closed in 2020 during the COVID-19 pandemic. Plans were put forward in 2019 for the center's renovation and repositioning. With the closing of Nordstrom, plans were presented to convert that space to housing and a hotel.

References

Shopping malls in Santa Barbara County, California
Shopping malls established in 1990
1990 establishments in California